The athletics competition at the 2017 Jeux de la Francophonie took place in Stade Félix Houphouët-Boigny in Abidjan from 23 to 27 July 2017.

Medal table

Medalists

Men

* Medalists who participated in heats only.

Women

Participating nations

References

External links
 Livre des resultats
Results

2017
Jeux de la Francophonie
2017 Jeux de la Francophonie
2017 Jeux de la Francophonie